Crossoloricaria cephalaspis is a species of armored catfish. It is endemic to Colombia where it is found in the Magdalena River basin.  This species grows to a length of  SL.

References 
 

Loricariini
Endemic fauna of Colombia
Freshwater fish of Colombia
Fish of the Andes
Magdalena River
Taxa named by Isaäc J. H. Isbrücker
Fish described in 1979